St Wilfrid’s Church, Barrow upon Trent is a Grade I listed parish church in the Church of England in Barrow upon Trent, Derbyshire.

History

The Church is a pre conquest Anglo Saxon building. It was given to the Knights Hospitaller in 1165 by Robert de Bakepuiz and they developed the building until around 1540.
The church is home to an alabaster effigy of a priest, thought to be John de Belton, which is believed to be the oldest existing alabaster effigy of a priest in the country.
The church is mentioned along with the village in the Domesday Book. Within the churchyard is the grave of Anne Mozley, editor of the Anglican papers of Cardinal (St) John Newman.

Parish status
The church is in a joint parish with 
All Saints’ Church, Aston-upon-Trent
St Andrew’s Church, Twyford
St Bartholomew’s Church, Elvaston
St James Church, Shardlow 
St James’ Church, Swarkestone
St Mary the Virgin’s Church, Weston-on-Trent

Memorials
The church contains memorials to 
Elizabeth Milward (d. 1610)
John Bancroft (d. 1803) by W Barton of Derby
Elizabeth Mozeley (d. 1883) by R C Lomas of Derby
Richard Sale (d. 1808) by Hall of Derby

See also
Grade I listed churches in Derbyshire
Listed buildings in Barrow upon Trent

References

Church of England church buildings in Derbyshire
Grade I listed churches in Derbyshire